The 2015–16 CSKA season was the 24th successive season that the club will play in the Russian Premier League, the highest tier of association football in Russia. CSKA will also take part in the Russian Cup and Champions League, entering at the Third qualifying round.

Squad

Out on loan

Transfers

In

Out

Loans in

Loans out

Friendlies

Competitions

Russian Premier League

Results by round

Matches

League table

Russian Cup

Final

UEFA Champions League

Qualifying round

Group stage

Squad statistics

Appearances and goals

|-
|colspan="14"|Players away from the club on loan:

|-
|colspan="14"|Players who left CSKA Moscow during the season:

|}

Goalscorers

Disciplinary record

References

PFC CSKA Moscow seasons
CSKA Moscow
CSKA Moscow
Russian football championship-winning seasons